The Best Chinese Universities Ranking (BCUR) is a ranking table of Chinese institutions of higher education. It is compiled by Shanghai Ruanke, the same agency that is behind the Academic Ranking of World Universities (ARWU).

References

External links 
http://www.shanghairanking.com/Chinese_Universities_Rankings/Overall-Ranking-2018.html

University and college rankings
Science and technology in the People's Republic of China
Universities in China
Higher education in China